Bill Leslie is a journalist who formerly anchored the morning and noon newscasts for WRAL-TV in Raleigh, North Carolina.  He is also known as a new age record artist  who, along with his World Music band Lorica who perform traditional as well as Celtic fusion music composed by Leslie.  Leslie has also composed music featured on two albums by Bragh Adair.  Leslie graduated from the University of North Carolina.

Career
Following his graduation from UNC in 1972, Bill began his radio and television career as a reporter and news anchor for WKIX radio in Raleigh. After a three-year stint, he then worked for WTAR in Norfolk and KULF in Houston, before returning to Raleigh in 1979 as News Director for WRAL-FM. In 1984, he transitioned to television work with WRAL-TV, where he has stayed for over 30 years. During that time, he served the station in a variety of roles, including News Director, weekend anchor, environmental reporter, and co-anchor of the morning and noon newscasts. Bill retired from WRAL-TV on June 29, 2018.

Awards
Leslie has won 2 George Foster Peabody Awards, 5 Emmys and has also been awarded the Society of Professional Journalists National Distinguished Public Service Award,  Robert F. Kennedy Journalism Award,  National Headliner Award, Gavel Award, RTNDA Edward R. Murrow Award, UPI National Award for Features and twice won the North Carolina Journalist of the Year.

New Age Reporter named Leslie "Best New Artist" and his Christmas in Carolina album was named "Best Holiday Album" in 2005.  Leslie's 2008 release "Blue Ridge Reunion" and 2010 release "Simple Beauty" were both named Best Acoustic Instrumental Album of the Year by international radio hosts who report to ZoneMusicReporter.com  
Peaceful Journey reached number one on the New Age Reporter's world music charts in December 2004, and Christmas in Carolina reached number two.  Zone Music Reporter ranked "Simple Beauty" number one on the world music charts in September 2010.  "Blue Ridge Reunion" was also number one on the Zone Music Reporter charts in September 2008.

The North Carolina Governor presented Leslie with the Order of the Long Leaf Pine for "extraordinary service to the state" during Leslie's final week on WRAL.

Discography
-(2011) "A Midnight Clear - Christmas in Mitford"
-(2010) "Simple Beauty"
(2008) Blue Ridge Reunion
(2006) I Am a River
(2002) Christmas in Carolina
(2003) Peaceful Journey

Videography
(2002) Christmas in Carolina

Books
(2008) Blue Ridge Reunion

References

External links
 Official website

UNC Hussman School of Journalism and Media alumni
1952 births
Living people
People from Morganton, North Carolina